Since her debut album in 1968, Canadian musician Joni Mitchell has released 19 studio albums, most recently 2007's Shine. Her most commercially successful period was the early-mid 1970s, which included 1970's Ladies of the Canyon, 1971's Blue and 1974's Court and Spark, all three of which reached Platinum status in the US.

In the United States alone, Mitchell has accrued record sales of 7 million certified by the RIAA. In the UK, she has certified sales in excess of 1.3 million copies.

Albums

Studio albums

Live albums

Compilation albums

Tribute albums 
 Various Artists: A Tribute to Joni Mitchell (2007)
 Herbie Hancock: River: The Joni Letters (2007)

Extended plays

Singles 

Notes
A^ "Big Yellow Taxi" also peaked at #19 on the Dutch Singles Chart.

Guest singles

Other charted songs

Videography

Video albums

Music videos

References 

Mitchell
Discography
Mitchell